Associazione Calcio ChievoVerona (more commonly called ChievoVerona or simply Chievo) is currently competing in its 4th consecutive season in the Serie A.

Serie A

Current squad

Transfers

In

Out

Notes
 Chievo got full ownership of Constant and then sold him to Genoa.

References

2011-12
Italian football clubs 2011–12 season